Meant to Be is a studio album by jazz guitarist John Scofield. It was the second of his albums to feature saxophonist Joe Lovano, and the first to be released as “The John Scofield Quartet” and to feature drummer Bill Stewart- who would go on to record and tour with Scofield for many years. The bassist is Marc Johnson, with whom Scofield had toured and recorded in Johnson's Bass Desires group.

Track listing
All tunes composed by John Scofield.
"Big Fan" - 6:03
"Keep Me in Mind" - 6:00
"Go Blow" - 8:19
"Chariots" - 6:02
"The Guinness Spot" - 6:35
"Mr. Coleman to You" - 6:02
"Eisenhower" - 5:20
"Meant to Be" - 7:07
"Some Nerve" - 5:10
"Lost in Space" - 6:30
"French Flics" - 5:28

Personnel
John Scofield – electric guitar
Joe Lovano – tenor saxophone, alto clarinet
Marc Johnson – double bass
Bill Stewart – drums

References 

1991 albums
John Scofield albums
Blue Note Records albums